Anurag Saikia (born in December 1988) is an Indian film score composer , music director , music producer and instrumentalist from Assam, India. He is one of the youngest composers to be awarded with Rajat Kamal for Best Non-Feature Film Music Direction for the film Yugadrashta.

His mother Dipali Saikia, is an All India Radio artist and teacher and his father Dr. Anil Saikia is an academician, who was conferred the Pratima Barua Pandey memorial Award on 27 December 2011 for his contributions towards the preservation and popularization of folk culture and music of the State of Assam.

After completing graduation from Cotton College, Anurag was admitted into the Swarnabhumi Academy of Music (SAM), Chennai. One of the latest movies he composed music for, is Thappad. He has worked with many popular artists like Sonu Nigam, Arijit Singh etc.

Saikia is known for his initiative of syncing Borgeets to the symphonic orchestra.

Filmography

As music director

 Yugadrashta
 Holding Back
 The Job
One Last Question (2015)
 Dikchow Banat Palaax (2016) 
 Maj Rati Keteki (2017)
Toba Tek Singh (2018)
 High Jack (2018)
 Karwaan (2018)
 Mulk (2018)
 Article 15 (2019)
 Thappad (2020)
 Kaun Pravin Tambe? (2022)
 Anek (2022)
 Bheed (2023)

As playback singer

 Anek (2022)

As lyricist

 Anek (2022)

As Music Director for Series

 Cubicles (2019 - )
 Gullak (2019 -2022 )
 Panchayat (2020)

As Music Producer (Independent Music)
 'Va Kanamma' The Anurag Saikia Collective 
 'Kukuha' The Anurag Saikia Collective  (2020)

Awards and nominations

References

Living people
Indian film score composers
Musicians from Assam
1988 births